The discography of Dominican recording artist Natti Natasha consists of two studio albums, one extended play, forty-six singles (including four as featured artist), and five promotional singles.

Studio albums

Extended plays

Singles

As lead artist

As featured artist

Promotional singles

Other charted songs

Guest appearances

Notes

References

Discography
Discographies of Dominican Republic artists
Latin pop music discographies